Ricardo Antonio Ronceros Ramos (born 20 July 1977) is a Peruvian footballer who plays as a centre back for Sport Huancayo.

Club career
Ronceros played in the youth teams of Universitario de Deportes and then played for their farm team U América FC.

He then had his first chance to play in the Torneo Descentralizado in the 1997 season with Alcides Vigo.

Honours

Club
José Gálvez
Torneo Intermedio: 2011
Segunda División: 2011

References

External links

1977 births
Living people
Footballers from Lima
Association football central defenders
Peruvian footballers
U América F.C. footballers
Club Alcides Vigo footballers
Unión Huaral footballers
Sport Coopsol Trujillo footballers
Sport Boys footballers
Club Deportivo Universidad César Vallejo footballers
José Gálvez FBC footballers
Cienciano footballers
FBC Melgar footballers
Universidad Técnica de Cajamarca footballers
Sport Huancayo footballers
Peruvian Segunda División players
Peruvian Primera División players
Copa Perú players